Johan Slager (born 8 June 1946, Amsterdam) is a Dutch musician best known as the original guitarist of rock band Kayak. He co-founded the band along with Ton Scherpenzeel, Pim Koopman, and Max Werner in 1972. He left the band in 1982 after nine albums, and returned briefly for a couple of performances in the 1990s. When Kayak reunited in 1999, Johan was replaced by Rob Winter.

During and after his time with Kayak, Slager played with many Dutch artists; he played on albums by Circus Custers, Bolland & Bolland and Ekseption, and formed his own band called Plus Doreen. His guitar sounds can also be heard on albums by his ex-Kayak mates Max Werner and Edward Reekers. In recent years, he has joined singer Michel van Dijk (Alquin). Together with befriended musicians they play in Dutch pubs, doing mostly covers (Rolling Stones, Bob Dylan, The Band, etc.).

References 

1946 births
Living people
Dutch rock guitarists
Dutch male guitarists
Musicians from Amsterdam
Earth and Fire members
Kayak (band) members